The 38th Writers Guild of America Awards honored the best television, and film writers of 1985. Winners were announced in 1986.

Winners & Nominees

Film 
Winners are listed first highlighted in boldface.

Television

Special Awards

References

External links 

 WGA.org

1985
W
1985 in American cinema
1985 in American television